Gornja Grabovica is a village in Valjevo, Serbia.

Gornja Grabovica may also refer to:

 Gornja Grabovica (Jablanica), a village in the Blidinje Nature Park, West Herzegovina Canton, Bosnia and Herzegovina

See also 
 Grabovica Gornja
 Grabovica (disambiguation)
 Grabovica River (disambiguation)
 Grabovac (disambiguation)